The 2015–16 UMass Lowell River Hawks women's basketball team will represent the University of Massachusetts Lowell during the 2015–16 NCAA Division I women's basketball season. The River Hawks were led by second year head coach Jenerrie Harris and will once again play most their home games in the Costello Athletic Center while select games will be played in the Tsongas Center and were members of the America East Conference. As part of their transition to Division I, they were ineligible for post season play until the 2017–18 season. They finished the season 4–24, 1–15 in America East play to finish in last place.

Media
All non-televised home games and conference road games will stream on either ESPN3 or AmericaEast.tv. Most road games will stream on the opponents website.

Roster

Schedule

|-
!colspan=9 style="background:#CC3333; color:#333399;"| Non-conference regular season

|-
!colspan=9 style="background:#CC3333; color:#333399;"| America East regular Season

See also
2015–16 UMass Lowell River Hawks men's basketball team

References

UMass Lowell River Hawks women's basketball seasons
UMass Lowell
UMass Lowell River Hawks women's basketball
UMass Lowell River Hawks women's basketball